Boekenhouthoek is a small village situated in the Mpumalanga province of South Africa, it falls under the Nkangala District Municipality.

References

Populated places in the Thembisile Hani Local Municipality